Sula is a municipality in Møre og Romsdal county, Norway. It is part of the Sunnmøre district. The administrative centre is the village of Langevåg. Other villages include Solevåg, Fiskarstrand, Veibust, Leirvågen, and Mauseidvåg. Sula is one of the most densely populated municipalities in Møre og Romsdal county, and it is part of the Ålesund Region since it is just south of the city of Ålesund. The municipality encompasses the island of Sula and the many small surrounding islets.

The  municipality is the 346th largest by area out of the 356 municipalities in Norway. Sula is the 118th most populous municipality in Norway with a population of 9,547.

General information

Originally, most of the island of Sula was part of the former municipality of Borgund and the small southwestern part of the island was part of extant municipality of Ulstein (see formannskapsdistrikt law). On 1 July 1958, the southwestern part of Sula island was transferred to Borgund. In 1968, Borgund (including all of the island of Sula) was merged with the town of Ålesund to form the large municipality of Ålesund. On 1 January 1977, the entire island of Sula and the many small islets around it were separated from Ålesund to become the new municipality of Sula. The initial population of the Sula was 6,302.

Name
The municipality is named after the island of Sula. The name is probably identical with the word sula which means "cleft", probably referring to the cleft between the twin peaks of Rundehornet and Vardane.

Coat of arms
The coat of arms was granted on 16 December 1983. The arms show a silver and blue figure which represents the cleft of the island.

Churches
The Church of Norway has one parish within Sula. It is part of the Nordre Sunnmøre prosti (deanery) in the Diocese of Møre.

Geography
Sula includes one main island and many small surrounding islets. It is bordered by the Sulafjorden strait to the west, the Storfjorden to the south, the Hessafjorden and Borgundfjorden to the north, and the narrow Vegsundet strait to the east. The only road access to the island is the European route E39 highway bridge over the Vegsundet.

The natural environment is typically coastal with a sparse forest. The landscape is mostly rocky with heather covering the ground. Its neighbouring municipalities are all separated from it by sea, with Hareid to the west, Ørsta to the south, Giske to the northwest, and Ålesund to the north and east.

Government
All municipalities in Norway, including Sula, are responsible for primary education (through 10th grade), outpatient health services, senior citizen services, unemployment and other social services, zoning, economic development, and municipal roads. The municipality is governed by a municipal council of elected representatives, which in turn elect a mayor. The municipality falls under the Møre og Romsdal District Court and the Frostating Court of Appeal.

Municipal council
The municipal council of Sula is made up of 29 representatives that are elected to four year terms. The party breakdown of the council is as follows:

Mayor
The mayors of Sula (incomplete list):
2015–present: Jim Arve Røssevoll (Ap)
2011-2015: Geir Ove Vegsund (H)
2003-2011: Ronny Harald Blomvik (FrP)
1999-2003: Egil Weltzien Holst (KrF)
1995–1999: Gunvor Reistad Aannø (H)
1986–1995: Ivar H. Molvær (KrF)

Culture
Sula is noted for strong traditions in the field of music. Nils Petter Molvær grew up in Langevåg. Also, the community harbours a strong maritime heritage. The influence of neighbouring city of Ålesund is strong; many live in Sula while working in Ålesund, which is a short ferry ride or a longer car ride away.

Economy
Manufacturing and production is the most important economical sector. Shipyards, fish processing, textile manufacturing, and furniture production are especially vital. The most famous clothing brand from Sula is Devold of Norway, with high quality woolen sweaters and underwear.

Transportation
Transportation in the municipality includes the European route E39 highway and several minor highways. The E39 highway enters Sula from the north (Ålesund) and it crosses the bridge at Vegsundet and continues west and then south to the Solevågen ferry quay where there are regular ferry routes to Festøya in Ørsta, across the Storfjorden. Also, there is a ferry connection in southwestern portion of Sula. This ferry has regular routes across the Sulafjorden from Sulasund to the village of Hareid on the island of Hareidlandet in the neighbouring municipality of Hareid.

Notable people 
 Anton Ludvig Alvestad (1883 in Sula – 1956) politician, Govt. minister and Mayor of Ålesund, 1920/21
 Inger Giskeødegård (born 1956 in Langevåg) a Norwegian autodidact illustrator
 Cecilie Fiskerstrand (born 1996) a footballer, plays goalkeeper for Brighton & Hove Albion W.F.C.

Musicians 
 Stein Erik Tafjord (born 1953 in Langevåg) a jazz musician (tuba), one of The Brazz Brothers
 Runar Tafjord (born 1957 in Langevåg) a jazz French horn player, one of The Brazz Brothers
 Nils Petter Molvær (born 1960 on Sula) a jazz trumpeter, composer and record producer 
 Harald Devold (1964 in Langevåg – 2016) jazz musician (alto & soprano saxophone and flute)
 Hild Sofie Tafjord (born 1974 in Langevåg) a Norwegian jazz musician (French horn)
 Kåre Nymark (born 1974 in Langevåg) a Norwegian jazz trumpeter and composer
 Robert Post (born 1979 in Langevåg) a Norwegian singer-songwriter
 Lena Nymark (born 1980) a jazz singer and music teacher; raised on the island Sula

References

External links

Municipal fact sheet from Statistics Norway 

 
Municipalities of Møre og Romsdal
1977 establishments in Norway